Huangnitang Subdistrict is a subdistrict in Louxing District of Loudi City, Hunan Province, People's Republic of China.

Administrative division
The subdistrict is divided into 5 villages and 14 communities, the following areas: 
 Xinli Community
 Fuling Community
 Shuangyuan Community
 Shichang Community
 Fengyang Community
 Gaoxi Community
 Hongjiazhou Community
 Tanjiashan Community
 Suoqiao Community
 Huamiaochong Community
 Chaoyang Community
 Gongyuan Community
 Pangshanchong Community
 Bixi Community
 Nanyang Village
 Enkou Village
 Donglai Village
 Caojia Village
 Lianbin Village

Geography
Lianshui River flows through the subdistrict.

Economy
The economy is supported primarily by commerce and local industry.

Education
Xiaoxiang Vocational College is a vocational college sits in the subdistrict.

Hospital
Loudi No. 1 Renmin Hospital is situated at the subdistrict.

Transportation

Railway
A railway heads to Qixingjie Town of Lianyuan.

Roads
The subdistrict is connected to three roads and streets: Loulian High-Grade Highway, Louxing North Street and Xinxing Road.

Attractions
Greet Mountain Park is located within the subdistrict limits and has boating, walking and sporting events.

References

External links

Divisions of Louxing District